Edward Moore, 5th Earl of Drogheda PC (I) (1701 – 28 October 1758) was an Anglo-Irish peer and politician.

Background
Moore was the second son of Charles Moore, Lord Moore, son of Henry Hamilton-Moore, 3rd Earl of Drogheda, and Jane Loftus, daughter of Lord Loftus. He served in the Irish House of Commons as the Member of Parliament for Dunleer between 1725 and 1727 when he succeeded to his elder brother's titles and took his seat in the Irish House of Lords. In 1748 he was invested as a member of the Privy Council of Ireland and made a Governor of Meath.

He married, firstly, Lady Sarah Ponsonby, daughter of Brabazon Ponsonby, 1st Earl of Bessborough, and Sarah Margetson, in 1727, with whom he had six sons and two daughters. Following her death on 19 January 1736, Moore married, secondly, Bridget Southwell, daughter of William Southwell and Lucy Bowen, on 13 October 1737.

Moore was lost in a storm at sea while travelling between Holyhead and Dublin in 1758 and was succeeded by his eldest son, Charles, who created Marquess of Drogheda in 1791.

See also
List of people who disappeared mysteriously at sea

References

1701 births
1750s missing person cases
1758 deaths
18th-century Anglo-Irish people
Earls of Drogheda
Irish MPs 1715–1727
Members of the Irish House of Lords
Members of the Parliament of Ireland (pre-1801) for County Louth constituencies
Members of the Privy Council of Ireland
Missing person cases in Europe
People lost at sea